WJBR may refer to:

 WJBR-FM, an FM radio station licensed to Wilmington, Delaware
 WWTX, an AM radio station licensed to Wilmington, Delaware, which held the call sign WJBR from 1978 to 2003